The Sanaghagara Waterfall is a waterfall located in the Kendujhar district in the Indian state of Odisha.

See also
List of waterfalls in India
List of waterfalls in India by height

References 

Waterfalls of Odisha